The old Redondo Beach Public Library is a small Spanish mission-style public works building located in Redondo Beach, California. It was built in the 1930s by Lovell Bearse Pemberton and is located adjacent to the Redondo Beach Pier, a popular tourist attraction in the Los Angeles Metropolitan Area. The building's main entrance faces east, towards a large open space park filled with a veterans' memorial and playground. The backside of the building faces the Pacific Ocean and offers benches for tourists to enjoy the view. The new library was opened in 1995.

References

Libraries in Los Angeles County, California